Persane was a 24-gun flüte of the French Navy.

Royal Navy Captain Murray Maxwell's squadron of three frigates intercepted the convoy. In the ensuing Action of 29 November 1811, Persane fought gallantly for four hours before being captured. Pomone was also taken, while Pauline fled.

Persane was afterwards sold to the Bey of Tunis.

Citations and references
Citations

References
 

Age of Sail frigates of France
1809 ships
Frigates of the French Navy